Shawinigan Handshake is the epithet given to a chokehold executed on February 15, 1996, by Jean Chrétien, then-Prime Minister of Canada, on anti-poverty protester Bill Clennett. The phrase comes from Chrétien's birthplace of Shawinigan, Quebec, as he often styled himself the "little guy from Shawinigan".

Background 
Political tensions had been high in Canada since the result of the October 30, 1995 referendum on Quebec separating from Canada, which failed by a narrow margin. On November 5, 1995, Quebec separatist André Dallaire broke into the prime minister's residence at 24 Sussex Drive. He was armed with a large hunting knife and had intended to kill Chretien. Dallaire was arrested before he could injure any person, but Chretien remained tense about the possibility of another attempt.

The incident

On the day of the incident, Chrétien was in Hull (Gatineau), Quebec to commemorate the first National Flag of Canada Day. As Chrétien addressed the assembled crowd, anti-poverty activists heckled the Prime Minister over proposed changes to Canada's unemployment insurance program, and, as he made his way to his limousine at the cessation of the ceremonies, Chrétien was confronted by Clennett. At that moment, Chrétien grabbed Clennett by the back of the neck and chin, forcing Clennett to the ground and breaking one of his teeth. Another protester who then blocked Chrétien's passage had his megaphone knocked away by the Prime Minister, and was promptly pushed to the ground by Royal Canadian Mounted Police (RCMP) officers.

Chrétien later defended these actions, stating: "some people came my way... and I had to go, so if you're in my way...."
He also blamed the RCMP for allowing Clennett to obtain such close proximity to the Prime Minister, though the RCMP said they saw no breach of security. Chrétien also demonstrated a casual attitude towards the affair, later joking that he had used the Shawinigan Handshake because he mistook Clennett for John Nunziata, whom Chrétien had dismissed from the Liberal caucus for voting against the 1996 budget.

Reform Party Member of Parliament Deborah Grey subsequently nicknamed Chrétien "The Shawinigan Strangler". This sobriquet was later used by other opposition MPs as well; in a member's statement on February 12, 1997, Chuck Strahl sarcastically nominated Chrétien for a "Parliamentary Oscar" for his "performance" in The Shawinigan Strangler.

While Clennett did not press charges against the Prime Minister, another person, Kenneth Russell, did accuse Chrétien of assault on March 28, and the Prime Minister was formally charged by a judge in the Quebec Superior Court. These charges, however, were rejected by the Attorney General of Quebec.

Aftermath and legacy 
In his 2007 autobiography, Chretien described his reaction to Clennett's approach as stemming in part from the trauma of the assassination attempt: "my reaction was instinctive and probably angrier than it would have been otherwise".

Bill Clennett has since run for provincial office, standing as a Québec solidaire candidate in Hull in Quebec's 2007 and 2008 provincial elections.  Bill Clennett and his team ranked third in 2008 after the Liberal Party of Quebec and the Parti Québécois, beating the Action démocratique du Québec, the Quebec Green Party, and the Independence Party.
Poet Stuart Ross arranged the text of Chrétien's comments on the incident into the form of a poem, "Minor Altercation", published the day after the event. It has since been often reprinted, both in its original leaflet form as well as in books, newspapers and magazines.

The epithet and incident remain enduring popular local lore in Shawinigan, decades after the incident.

Following the incident, popular Canadian TV sports personality Don Cherry commented that he liked politicians being direct in this manner, and the performance of Chrétien in particular.

Shawinigan microbrewery Trou du Diable has released an award-winning beer named "Shawinigan Handshake" with Prime Minister Jean Chrétien strangling Cherry on its label, in honour of the local lore.

Since the incident, many celebrities and politicians have been jokingly held by Chrétien in the famous chokehold, when visiting him in Shawinigan. These include Cherry, politician Michael Ignatieff, comedian Rick Mercer, and Prime Minister Justin Trudeau.

The incident was referenced in a 2021 Beaverton article, which (humorously) claimed that Chrétien, age 87, had been hired as Justin Trudeau's bodyguard. In addition to supposedly putting a protester into the famous chokehold, he was also described as carrying a riot baton, crushing a rock into dust, and threatening to attack a protester "like I did with Justice Gomery".

References

External links
 CBC Archives

1996 in Quebec
1996 in Canadian politics
Chokeholds
Political scandals in Canada
Political controversies in Canada
Canadian political phrases
Grappling positions
Jean Chrétien
History of Gatineau
Political history of Canada